The 1986 Wisconsin gubernatorial election was held on November 4, 1986. Republican Tommy Thompson won the election with 53% of the vote, winning his first term as Governor of Wisconsin and defeating incumbent Governor Anthony Earl. This was the first time since 1962 that the winner of a Wisconsin gubernatorial election was of the same party as the incumbent president. Jonathan B. Barry unsuccessfully sought the Republican nomination.

Results

References

Wisconsin
1986 Wisconsin elections
1986